Payena khoonmengiana is a tree in the family Sapotaceae. The bark is reddish brown. Inflorescences bear one or two flowers. The tree is named for forest botanist Meng Wong Khoon. Its habitat is lowland forest at about  altitude. P. khoonmengiana is endemic to Borneo and known only from Sabah.

References

khoonmengiana
Endemic flora of Borneo
Trees of Borneo
Flora of Sabah
Plants described in 1997